Roin Oniani (born 14 June 1975) is a Georgian former professional footballer who played for the Georgia national team.

External links

 Career summary by playerhistory.com

1975 births
Living people
Footballers from Georgia (country)
Georgia (country) international footballers
FC Kolkheti Khobi players
FC Lokomotivi Tbilisi players
FC Sioni Bolnisi players
FC Dila Gori players
FC Dinamo Batumi players
FC Metalurgi Rustavi players
FC Zestafoni players
FC Zugdidi players
Association football defenders
Association football midfielders